Caitlin Elizabeth Wachs (pronounced wax; born March 15, 1989) is an American production coordinator and actress. She appeared alongside Ally Walker and Robert Davi on the NBC television series Profiler in the role of Chloe Waters and played the president's daughter, Rebecca Calloway, on the ABC television series Commander in Chief.

Early life 
Wachs was born in Eugene, Oregon. Her parents are Patrice Wachs, a graphic designer, and Allan Wachs, a music video producer. She has a younger brother, Whitman Wachs, who was born in 2000.

Filmography

Film

Television

References

External links
 
 Caitlin Wachs on Twitter

1989 births
American child actresses
American film actresses
American soap opera actresses
American television actresses
Living people
Actresses from Eugene, Oregon
20th-century American actresses
21st-century American actresses